Colobothea lineatocollis is a species of beetle in the family Cerambycidae. It was described by Bates in 1865. It is known from French Guiana.

References

lineatocollis
Beetles described in 1865